The moustache cup (or mustache cup) is a drinking cup with a semicircular ledge inside. The ledge, called a moustache guard, has a half moon-shaped opening to allow the passage of liquids and serves as a guard to keep moustaches dry.  It is generally acknowledged to have been invented in the 1870s by British potter Harvey Adams (1835–?).

Historic context 
Moustaches flourished throughout the Victorian era, and by the early twentieth century, the British Army required soldiers to grow a moustache. Often, moustache wax was applied to the moustache to keep it stiff, with every hair in place. When drinking hot liquids, steam from the drink would melt the wax, which would drip into the cup. Sipping hot tea or coffee would also often stain moustaches.

Production 

The new invention spread all over the European continent and soon, every famous potter was making the new cups. A multiplicity of moustache cups were made by famous manufactories such as Meissen, Royal Crown Derby, Imari, Royal Bayreuth, Limoges and others. Each potter created his own version of this masculine tableware and the news of that invention soon spread to America.

Although many moustache cups were made in America, the earliest were marked with names which led buyers to believe they were actually manufactured in England. This was due to the popularity of English-made ceramics. Therefore, with the exception of the quadruple silverplate moustache cups made in the U.S., it is nowadays extremely difficult to find an authentic Victorian moustache cup bearing an American pottery mark.

Decline and resurgence 
Between 1920 and 1930, moustaches progressively began to go out of fashion; hence, moustache cup production fell. Today, though, these examples of Victorian male elegance are coveted and collected by a growing number of enthusiasts.

Moustache cups are becoming highly collectible as their popularity has increased in recent years due to a resurgence of men's facial hair styles, particularly ones calling for moustache wax.

In popular culture 
In James Joyce's Ulysses, Leopold Bloom drinks his tea from a moustache cup he received from his daughter Milly for his twenty-seventh birthday.

In the opening scene of the 1931 short comedy Be Big!, Oliver Hardy, while packing for a trip to Atlantic City, coyly asks his wife if she packed his moustache cup.

In Episode 15 of Season 4 of The Andy Griffith Show, Aunt Bee receives one as a gift from a local farmer, Mr. Frisby.

In Margaret Mitchell’s novel Gone With the Wind, Scarlett O'Hara thinks of the painted China moustache cups she made for the bazaar.

See also
 Fuddling cup
 Noggin (cup)
 Plastic cup
 Pythagorean cup

References

External links
 Mustache Cup on Silver Dictionary

Drinkware